The Majaceite, also known as the Guadalcacín, is the main tributary of the river Guadalete in Andalusia, Spain.  Most of its course runs through the national park of the Sierra de Grazalema.  The Battle of Majaceite took place on its banks in 1836.

See also 
 List of rivers of Spain

Rivers of Spain
Rivers of Andalusia